The 74th Scripps National Spelling Bee was held in Washington, D.C. on May 29–31, 2001, sponsored by the E.W. Scripps Company.

Winners

Thirteen-year-old Sean Conley, from Anoka, Minnesota won the competition in the 16th round by correctly spelling the word "succedaneum". Conley was appearing in his third bee. He fell in the sixth round in 1999, and placed second in 2000. Second place went to Kristin Hawkins of Virginia, who missed "resipiscence".

Competition
248 contestants participated in the competition; 138 girls and 110 boys; 170 from public schools, 28 from private schools, 25 from parochial schools, and 25 home-schoolers. Fifty-two spellers had previously participated in a national bee, a new record.

The bee used a three-day format for the first time this year, though bee staff already planned to return to two days the following year by adding a written-test for the first time. The contest began at 4pm on Tuesday May 29, with one-half of the spellers competing in round one starting at 4pm, and the other half at 7pm. 178 spellers survived the first day. Two additional split-rounds continued on Wednesday. The finals, with survivors from both groups, started at 8am on Thursday and were broadcast on ESPN starting at 10am.

The first place prize was $10,000, and second place took $5000.

References

External links
 List of spellers eliminated in Rounds 1-4 in order and by word, via USA Today

Scripps National Spelling Bee competitions
2001 in Washington, D.C.
2001 in education
May 2001 events in the United States